Sofi de la Torre (16 March 1991) is a singer and songwriter from the Canary Islands, whose music combines elements from chillwave and rhythm and blues.

After high school, where she discovered a talent for music, she moved to Los Angeles, but then went to London to go to school, studying media and communications. She turned back to music and released two pop-rock singles ("Heartbeat" and "Faster"), and was asked by German film director Felix Fuchssteiner to contribute them to the soundtrack of Rubinrot ("Ruby Red"); she also appeared in the movie. She released her first album, Mine, in 2013 to modest success. In 2014, she gained international attention with the single "Vermillion", co-written with Jonas W. Karlsson. After that, three EPs followed: Give Up at 2, Mess, and That Isn't You, and with Karlsson she produced, in 2017, the single "London x Paris." Karlsson also produced her second album, Another? Not Me, I'm Done.

Discography

Albums
Mine (2013)
Another? Not Me, I'm Done

References

Living people
Singers from the Canary Islands
1991 births
English-language singers from Spain